Ideopsis gaura, the smaller wood nymph, is a species of nymphalid butterfly in the Danainae subfamily. It is found in Southeast Asia.

Larvae feed on Melodinus especially M. laevigatus.

Adults are mimicked by Graphium delessertii and Cyclosia pieridoides.

Subspecies
Listed alphabetically:
I. g. anapina Semper, 1892
I. g. anapis (C. & R. Felder, 1861)
I. g. bracara Fruhstofer, 1910
I. g. canlaonii Jumalon, 1971
I. g. costalis (Moore, 1883)
I. g. daos (Boisduval, [1836])
I. g. eudora (Gray, 1846)
I. g. gaura (Horsfield, [1829])
I. g. glaphyra Moore, 1883
I. g. kajangensis Okubo, 1983
I. g. lingana Fruhstorfer, 1910
I. g. natunensi]]s Fruhstorfer, 1910
I. g. nigrocostalis Hagen, 1902
I. g. messala Fruhstorfer, 1910
I. g. palawana Fruhstorfer, 1910
I. g. perakana Fruhstorfer, 1899
I. g. pseudocostalis van Eecke, 1914

References

Ideopsis
Butterflies of Indochina
Butterflies described in 1829